John Jeremiah "Lefty" Sullivan (May 31, 1894 – July 7, 1958) was a pitcher in Major League Baseball. He played for the Chicago White Sox in 1919.

References

External links

1894 births
1958 deaths
Major League Baseball pitchers
Chicago White Sox players
Baseball players from Chicago